Federal Medical Centre, Makurdi is a federal government of Nigeria medical centre located in Makurdi, Benue State, Nigeria. The current chief medical director is Peter Inunduh.

History 
Federal Medical Centre, Makurdi was established in 1967. The hospital was formerly known as General Hospital, Makurdi.

CMD 
The current chief medical director is Peter Inunduh.

References 

Hospitals in Nigeria